HMS Rochester was a 50-gun fourth rate ship of the line of the Royal Navy, built at Deptford Dockyard and launched on 3 August 1749.

In contrast to standard practise at the time, Rochester was not built to the Establishment of dimensions in effect at the time (in this case, the 1741 proposals of the 1719 Establishment). Rochester and her sister-ship, were  longer than the Establishment specified, and were ordered as an experiment in building larger ships in response to the widening gulf between the sizes of British ships and their continental counterparts.

Rochester was eventually sold out of the navy in 1770.

Notes

References

Lavery, Brian (2003) The Ship of the Line - Volume 1: The development of the battlefleet 1650-1850. Conway Maritime Press. .

External links
 

Ships of the line of the Royal Navy
1749 ships